Oxynthes is a genus of skippers in the family Hesperiidae.

Species
Recognised species in the genus Oxynthes include:
 Oxynthes corusca (Herrich Schäffer, 1869)
 Oxynthes trinka ((Evans, [1955])

Former species
Oxynthes viricuculla Hayward, 1951 - transferred to Noxys viricuculla (Hayward, 1951)

References

Natural History Museum Lepidoptera genus database

Hesperiini
Hesperiidae genera